The 'governor of the Eastern Caribbean Central Bank is the head of the central banking system of the Eastern Caribbean region. To date there have been three governors, with the incumbent Timothy Antoine in office since February 2016.

Governors of the Eastern Caribbean Central Bank

References

Central banks